Warmi Wañusqa (Quechua warmi woman, wife, wañuy die, -sqa a suffix (wañusqa died, dead), "woman who died" or "woman died", also spelled Huarmihuanusca, Huarmihuañusca, Warmihuañusca, Warmihuanuscca, Warmiwañusca, Warmiwañuscca, Warmi Wanusca) is a mountain pass in the Cusco Region in Peru. It is located in the Urubamba Province, Machupicchu District. Warmi Wañusqa lies on the Inca Trail to Machu Pikchu, southwest of the archaeological site of Patallaqta.

See also 
 Inti Punku
 Phuyupata Marka
 Qunchamarka
 Runkuraqay
 Wiñay Wayna
 Me la Pelas

References 

Landforms of Cusco Region
Mountain passes of Peru